Epsilon Reticuli b, sometimes designated Epsilon Reticuli Ab to distinguish from the white dwarf companion of the primary star Epsilon Reticuli, also known as HD 27442, was discovered on December 16, 2000 by the Anglo-Australian Planet Search Team using the radial velocity method. The planet's mass is at least 56% greater than Jupiter mass, a more accurate estimate requiring its inclination to be known.

The planet orbits its parent star relatively close, and with more than twice the eccentricity of Earth's orbit. Based on its mass, it is almost certainly a gas giant.

References

External links
 
 The Extrasolar Planets Encyclopaedia entry

Reticulum (constellation)
Exoplanets discovered in 2000
Giant planets
Exoplanets detected by radial velocity